The Evolution of Gospel is the debut studio album by Sounds of Blackness, released May 7, 1991, on A&M Records. In 1992, the album received the Grammy Award for Best Gospel Choir or Chorus Album.

Track listing

Chart positions

Album

Singles

"Optimistic"

"The Pressure Pt. 1"

"Testify"

References

1991 debut albums
A&M Records albums
Albums produced by Jimmy Jam and Terry Lewis
Sounds of Blackness albums